Ipswich is the county town of Suffolk, England

Ipswich may also refer to:

Places

Australia
 Ipswich, Queensland, Australia
 City of Ipswich, local government area
 Ipswich (suburb), Queensland
 Electoral district of Ipswich
 Electoral district of Ipswich (New South Wales), a former electoral district in New South Wales

England
 Ipswich (UK Parliament constituency)
 Ipswich (borough), local government borough

United States
 Ipswich, Massachusetts, a New England town
 Ipswich (CDP), Massachusetts, the main village in the town
 Ipswich (MBTA station)
 Ipswich, South Dakota
 Ipswich, Wisconsin

Sports
 Ipswich Town F.C., an English Football League team in Ipswich, Suffolk
 Ipswich Knights Soccer Club, a soccer club in Ipswich, Queensland
 Ipswich Jets, a rugby club in Ipswich, Queensland
 Ipswich Cougars an American football club in Ipswich, Queensland
 Ipswich Cardinals, an American football club in Ipswich, Suffolk
 Ipswich Witches, a British speedway club based at Ipswich, Suffolk

Other uses
 Ipswich River, a river in Massachusetts, United States
 Ipswitch, Inc., creator of the File Transfer Protocol software WS FTP
 HMAS Ipswich, two warships operated by the Royal Australian Navy (RAN)
 Ipswich School, an independent school in Ipswich, Suffolk
 Ipswichian interglacial, alternative name for the Eemian Stage, Pleistocene English interglacial period dating from 75,000 to 130,000 years ago
 Ipswich clams, Soft-shell clams

See also
2006 Ipswich murder investigation